Liu Cunzhi (11 November 1924 – 22 October 2013) was a lieutenant general (zhongjiang) of the People's Liberation Army (PLA). He was a delegate to the 6th and 7th National People's Congress, and a member of the 8th National Committee of the Chinese People's Political Consultative Conference.

Biography
Liu was born in Tongliao County, Liaoning, on 11 November 1924, while his ancestral home in Qingyun County, Shandong. He enlisted in the Eighth Route Army in 1937, and joined the Chinese Communist Party (CCP) in 1939. During the Second Sino-Japanese War, he joined an underground resistance movement in response to the ongoing occupation of China by the Empire of Japan. During the Chinese Civil War, he engaged in the Linjiang Campaign, Liaoshen campaign, and Pingjin campaign. During the Korean War, he was assigned to North Korea and fought under Peng Dehuai. In May 1989, he was named acting commander of Guangzhou Military Region while commander Zhang Wannian was ill. On 22 October 2013, he died from an illness in Guangzhou, Guangdong, aged 88.

Personal life 
His younger brother Liu Cunxin was also a lieutenant general (zhongjiang) of the People's Liberation Army (PLA).

References

1924 births
2013 deaths
People from Tongliao
People's Liberation Army generals from Liaoning
Commanders of the Guangzhou Military Region
Delegates to the 6th National People's Congress
Delegates to the 7th National People's Congress
People's Republic of China politicians from Liaoning
Chinese Communist Party politicians from Liaoning
Members of the Standing Committee of the 8th Chinese People's Political Consultative Conference